Wagenfuhr is a surname. Notable people with the surname include:

David Wagenfuhr (born 1982), American soccer player
Sarah Wagenfuhr (born 1986), American soccer player